Metal Mickey is a fictional five-foot-tall robot, as well as the name of a spin-off television show starring the same character. The robot character was created, controlled and voiced by Johnny Edward.

The character of Metal Mickey first appeared on British television in the ITV children's magazine show The Saturday Banana, produced by Southern Television in 1978. Humphrey Barclay saw Mickey on Jimmy Savile's Jim'll Fix It television show. Seeing the children chatting in the marketplace with the friendly robot led to the creation of the Metal Mickey television show. Within a month the pilot had been video-taped, and shortly after this the series went live with its first six episodes. 41 episodes were made in total, broadcast over three separate series between September 1980 and January 1983. The show attracted viewing figures of around 12 million at its peak. Micky Dolenz, formerly of The Monkees pop group, was brought in to produce and direct the series along with Nic Phillips and David Crossman.

Metal Mickey television show

The television show was created under LWT's Humphrey Barclay who described Metal Mickey as a show "with the appeal of Star Wars, the Daleks and Mork and Mindy". It ran from 1980 to 1983.

The series was set in the home of an ordinary British family, whose youngest child was a science boffin, who had created Metal Mickey to help around the home. The family consisted of a mother and father, three children and a grandmother. The show was made by London Weekend Television and shown on the ITV network, with the entire run of 41 episodes being written by comedy writer Colin Bostock-Smith.

British comedy actress Irene Handl played the grandmother, whom Mickey affectionately called "my little fruitbat". He also referred to his inventor as "Clever Clogs", his inventor's sister as "Stringbean" and their father as "Bootface". Handl was never at home with science fiction, either watching it or appearing in it. She famously told BBC presenter Noel Edmonds, when he asked her whether she cried over the death of E.T., "Why should I cry over a bleedin' Hoover attachment?"

Metal Mickey's catchphrase was "boogie, boogie", and his favourite treat were Atomic Thunderbusters (which had the appearance of lemon bonbons). At the height of the series' popularity, fizzbomb sweets were marketed in the UK under the name Metal Mickey's Atomic Thunderbusters.

Cast
Michael Stainton ...  Father
Georgina Melville ...  Mother
Ashley Knight ...  Ken
Lucinda Bateson ...  Haley
Lola Young ...  Janey
Gary Shail ...  Steve
Metal Mickey ...  Metal Mickey
Irene Handl ...  Granny

Production credits
Directors: Michael Dolenz, David Crossman, Nic Phillips
Producer: Michael Dolenz
Writer: Colin Bostock-Smith
Designers: Mike Oxley, Rae George, David Catley, James Dillion, Phil Coulter
Music: Phil Coulter

DVD releases
The first two series of Metal Mickey have been released on DVD. The third series was due to be released in mid-2009.

Discography
Metal Mickey was credited as artist on several record releases, some of them on his own label "Mickeypops":
"Lollipop"/"Eugene" (EMI, 1979)
"Metal Mickey Magic"/"Meet Metal Mickey" (Mickeypops, 1980)
"Sillycon Chip"/"Dubb Vahzun" (Mickeypops, 1981)
"Do The Funky Robot"/"Do The Funky Robot Again" (Mickeypops, 1982)
"Theme Tune From 'Metal Mickey'"/"Fruitbat Rap" (Hollywood, 1982)
"I Wanna Hold Your Hand"/"Eugene Machino" (Hollywood, 1983)

See also
List of fictional robots and androids
Science fiction sitcom

References

External links
 
Metal Mickey Official Site
Metal Mickey — ITV TV Classics; including the complete first series available to watch online

1980 British television series debuts
1983 British television series endings
1980s British children's television series
ITV children's television shows
ITV sitcoms
Fictional robots
London Weekend Television shows
British television shows featuring puppetry
Television series by ITV Studios
Television characters introduced in 1978
British science fiction television shows
English-language television shows
British